Lieutenant General Julio Canessa Roberts (19 March 1925 – 24 January 2015) was a Chilean military and political figure. He was a member of the Government Junta that ruled Chile from 1973 to 1990, representing the Army. He was also a designated Senator between 1998 and 2006.

General Canessa was Army Vice Commander-in-chief from 1983 to 1985 and a member of the Government Junta from 1985 to 1986. He was replaced by Humberto Gordon. In 1998, he was designated Senator after a nomination from the National Security Council. As a Senator he opposed the Concert of Parties for Democracy on the Indigenous law, seeing it as bad for development, and in 2001 he defended landmines as necessary. Later the positions of the Designated Senators were eliminated because of the Constitutional Reforms of 2004. He died at the age of 89 on 24 January 2015.

References 

1925 births
2015 deaths
Members of the Senate of Chile
Chilean Army generals
Chilean people of English descent
Chilean people of Italian descent
20th-century Chilean military personnel